Senator Wellman may refer to:

Abijah J. Wellman (1836–1889), New York State Senate
Arthur Holbrook Wellman (1855–1948), Massachusetts State Senate